The 2010 Asian Para Games, also known as the First Asian Para Games, was a parallel sport event for Asian athletes with a disability held in Guangzhou, China. Two weeks after the conclusion of the 16th Asian Games, It opened on December 12 and closed on December 19, 2010.

Approximately 5,500 athletes from 45 Asian member nations participated in 341 events from 19 sports. The games was opened by vice premier Li Keqiang at the Guangdong Olympic Stadium.

The final medal tally was led by China, followed by South Korea and third place Japan. 17 world and 82 Asian records were broken during the games.

Host city
The Asian Para Games succeeded the FESPIC Games, whose governing body the FESPIC Federation was dissolved during the last edition in 2006 in Kuala Lumpur, Malaysia after merger with Asian Paralympic Council to become Asian Paralympic Committee. 

On July 1, 2004, the Olympic Council of Asia (OCA) selected Guangzhou to host the 2010 Asian Games at their 23rd general assembly session in Doha, Qatar, with Guangzhou being the sole bidder of the event. A FESPIC Federation General Assembly held on 28 November 2006 at the last FESPIC Games' host city appointed the city as host of the Para Games, resulted in the tradition of hosting both the Asian Games and Para Games in the same city. 

However, as the Asian Paralympic Committee had just emerge, they have yet to sign any agreement with the Olympic Council of Asia. Hence, the Asian Para Games were not yet included in the Asian Games' host city contract. Both games ran independently of each other and were managed by different Organising Committees: Guangzhou Asian Games Organising Committee (GAGOC) for Asian Games and Guangzhou Asian Para Games Organising Committee (GAPGOC) for Asian Para Games.

Development and preparation

Venues
Competition and training venues plus all other facilities used for the 16th Asian Games were converted to meet the disability-accessible requirements for Asian Para Games athletes, officials, staff and audience.
 Guangdong Olympic Stadium (Chief stadium) - Opening and closing ceremonies, Athletics (track and field)
 Aoti Archery Range - Archery
 Tianhe Gymnasium - Badminton
 Zhongda Gymnasium - Boccia
 Tianhe Bowling Hall - Bowling
 Guangzhou Velodrome - Cycling (track)
 University Town Triathlon Venue - Cycling (road), Athletics (marathon)
 Aoti Hockey Field - Football 5-a-side
 Huagong Stadium - Football 7-a-side
 Huagong Gymnasium - Judo
 Guanggong Gymnasium - Goalball
 Asian Games Town Gymnasium - Powerlifting, Table tennis
 Guangdong International Rowing Centre - Rowing
 Aoti Shooting Range - Shooting
 Aoti Aquatic Centre - Swimming
 Guangwai Gymnasium - Sitting volleyball
 Guangyao Gymnasium - Wheelchair basketball
 Guangda Gymnasium - Wheelchair fencing
 Tianhe Tennis School - Wheelchair tennis

Marketing

Emblem
The official emblem was inspired by traditional Xiguan coloured glass windows used in Guangzhou since the 17th century and is an important part of Lingnan architecture. The gaps between the coloured glass displays a silhouette of an athlete in motion. The overall design represents both the hospitality of the people of Guangzhou and the ability of the Asian Para Games to break down barriers between abled and disabled people.

Mascot
The official mascot for the 1st Asian Para Games is Fun Fun (芬芬), an anthropomorphic kapok, a flower which is native to Guangzhou. The mascot represents strength, joy and vitality of the athletes and the Asian Para movement.

Both the emblem and the mascot were unveiled on 6 November 2010.

Music

The Guangzhou Asian Para Games Organising Committee (GAPGOC) selected "阳光起航" ("Yangguang Qihang", which means set sail in the sunshine) as the theme song for the Games.

Ceremony

Opening ceremony
The 2010 Asian Para Games opening ceremony was held at 8:00pm China Standard Time (UTC+8) on 12 December in the Guangdong Olympic Stadium. The ceremony's artistic section "A Beautiful World" (美丽的世界) was supervised by director-in-chief Zhu Jianwei and included more than 4600 performers, among whom 300 were disabled. Zhu described the ceremony as an emotional event which highlighted the power of love, family and people with a disability.

The opening ceremony was attended by Chinese Vice Premier Li Keqiang, President of Asian Paralympic Committee Dato' Zainal Abu Zarin and President of the International Paralympic Committee Philip Craven. Some 60,000 spectators watched the ceremony inside the stadium.

Entry of dignitaries
The ceremony began with the entry into the stadium of Li Keqiang, Dato' Zainal Abu Zarin and other distinguished guests.

Preluding sequence
Entitled "Running" (奔跑), the first sequence began with hundreds of performers running onto the stadium holding large LED flower props and rearranging themselves to recreate the emblem of these Asian Para Games, a coloured window panel (Xiguan glass) featuring the outline of a running athlete. Next, a giant LED model of this running athlete, suspended by wires, gradually descended to the centre of the stadium, signalling the start of the ceremony with a countdown.

The flag of the People's Republic of China was carried into the stadium by a visually impaired boy, He Yuxuan accompanied by his mother. The flag was handed over to eight soldiers from the People's Liberation Army. He Yuxuan then touched the flag with his hands before the soldiers carried the flag to the flag podium in a slow, goose-stepping march. The flag was raised accompanied by the Chinese national anthem.

Parade of nations
Some of the mothers of the athletes competing at the games and more than 300 mothers of Chinese children with a disability first paraded into the stadium. The mothers lined the pathway holding flowers, the games' mascot Fun Fun and banners to cheer for the entering athletes. The sequence of entry was determined by the alphabetical order of the IOC code of each nation with Afghanistan being the first nation to enter. The host nation China was the last to enter. During the parade, Chinese pop music was played to liven the mood.

Speeches
Four dignitaries then walked onto the podium at the centre of the stadium. They were:
Dato' Zainal Abu Zarin, President of Asian Paralympic Committee
Liu Peng, the President of the GAPGOC (2010 Guangzhou Asian Para Games Organising Committee) and President of the Chinese Olympic Committee
Huang Huahua, the Executive President of the GAPGOC and Governor of Guangdong Province
Wang Xinxian, the Executive President of the GAPGOC and President of the Chinese Paralympic Committee

Wang Xinxian, Huang Huahua and Liu Peng made each made speeches in Chinese highlighting the auspicious and historic nature of the games and welcomed athletes and visitors to Guangzhou. They also thanked the contributions of governments, organisers, volunteers and the people of Guangzhou. Each expressed their desires for a successful event. Dato' Zainal Abu Zarin made a speech in English, making occasional remarks in Malaysian and Chinese. He described these games as a "benchmark" for future events and praised the "unwaivering support" of the Chinese people. Abu Zarin acknowledged the work of the Chinese Paralympic Committee, GAPGOC and all levels of Chinese government. He thanked the sponsors, volunteers and the people of Guangzhou and congratulated the participating athletes. Afterwards, Li Keqiang, Vice Premier of China, formally opened the 2010 Asian Para Games.

The flag of the Asian Paralympic Committee was carried into the stadium by eight Chinese Paralympic gold-medal athletes. This was accompanied by the official games theme song "Sailing with Sunshine" performed by Liao Changyong and Liu Fei. The flag was raised along with the playing of the anthem of the Asian Paralympic Committee.

The athlete's oath was taken by Chinese athlete Li Duan while the judge's oath as taken by Malaysian referee Yeoh Keat Chye.

A beautiful world
The first part was entitled "Aspirations" (心声). A fictional girl by the name of Zhenzhen, a deaf-mute person (the actor Shi Shuyin also has the same condition), used sign language to display her desire to speak and to be heard by her parents. Next, performers throughout the arena displayed a series of choreographed hand gestures in sign language. A large suspended platform carrying a woman and a girl, both dressed in yellow, gently rises from the ground. Simultaneously, numerous LED screens outlining pairs of hands magically rose from the stadium. Eighty children from a school for the blind in Guangzhou were brought onto the stadium along with eighty able-bodied children signifying the need for friendship and respect between disabled and non-disabled people. A number of seagull models hung from wire emerged and they lifted red, green and blue ribbons representing the Asian Para Games high into the sky. Finally, six images of sign language hand gestures on a metal frame were created using fireworks. The meaning of the gestures was "sunlight, love, life"

The next part was called "Pursuing the Dream" (追梦). The sequence opened with the visually impaired boy He Yuxuan playing the piano with his mother at his side. In the background, a conversation between Zhenzhen and her mother occurred where Zhenzhen remarked that she cannot hear the piano. Numerous flowers props adorned with LED lights appeared in the background with a ballerina performing in the centre. The weird colours and shapes represented the imagined world and artistic expressions of the blind. Performers dressed as butterflies descended while children dressed as frogs hopped around the stadium. A song was then performed by Chinese singer Tang Can.

The last part was called "Flying" (飞翔). This part began with a vigorous dance featuring Zhai Xiaowei (a man who has lost leg) and Ma Li (a woman who has lost an arm). Around 800 male performers each holding two wheels, representing either a wheelchair or wings, performed a series of dynamic choreographed movements. Next, 20 people in wheelchairs moved into the centre followed by a flying model of a phoenix carrying a little girl. This performance symbolised the ideals and aspirations of people with a disability. Another song was performed by Sun Yue and Sha Baoliang.

The Asian Para Games flame entered the stadium and was relayed around the stadium by 9 athletes as well as by Zhenzhen.

The torch bearers, in order, were:
 Chen Qi (silver medalist at the First Asian Wheelchair Basketball Championships)
 Huang Jiehua (captain of the Guangdong Paralympic swim team and gold medallist at numerous national championships)
 Wu Yancong (Paralympic gold medallist in high jump)
 Shan Zilong (Paralympic gold medallist in rowing)
 Li Hedong (gold medallist in World Shooting Championships)
 Xiao Yanhong (Paralympic gold medallist in archery)
 Zhenzhen and family
Zhang Lixin (China May 4th Youth Medallist and Paralympic gold medallist in athletics)
Zhang Haiyuan (Outstanding Athlete of the Chinese Paralympic Team and Paralympic gold medallist in athletics)

The final two torchbearers Zhang Lixin and Zhang Haiyuan, both without a left leg, then began to climb up a man-made cliff alternately. One of them would climb up a small distance while the other one held onto the torch, then the torch would be handed over allowing the latter to climb. The process continued until both torchbearers reached the summit of the 'mountain'. The torch was then placed in a container which was wound up to the base of the spiral-shaped cauldron. Finally, the cauldron was lit. The song "The Glory of Life" (生命的辉煌) performed by various artists and an extensive fireworks display concluded the ceremony.

Closing ceremony
The closing ceremony was held at 8:00pm on 19 December in the Guangdong Olympic Stadium featuring Chinese cultural performances and fireworks. The 40-minute artistic performance was entitled "You Make the World Different" comprising three chapters, namely "Sky and Sea" (blue), "Leaf and Vein" (green), and "Light and Dream" (red), and was themed on the concepts of reunion and departure. It featured songs by local artists Cao Fujia, Huang Zheng, Xu Yang and Shi Peng and a performance by hundreds of children.

Among the highlights was as the cauldron flame was extinguished, the torch which ignited the cauldron during the opening ceremony was relit and passed down the man-made cliff below the cauldron by several disabled athletes forming the Chinese character for people "ren" (人). The flame was then carried in a rectangular lantern and handed over to Wan Qingliang, the mayor of Guangzhou. As the first Asian Para Games, the flame will be kept in Guangzhou forever. The torch and flag of the Guangzhou Asian Para games as well as the flag of the Asian Paralympic Committee were passed from Wan Qingling to Dato' Zainal Abu Zarin who passed it on to the President of South Korea Paralympic Committee for the 2014 Games. All future games closing ceremonies will involve delegations passing the torch and flag of the Guangzhou Games.

The closing ceremony was attended by President of Asian Paralympic Committee Dato' Zainal Abu Zarin and State Councilor of the People's Republic of China Liu Yandong. In their speeches, the officials and organisers congratulated the athletes and thanked them for contributing to the success of the games. Wang Xinxian, President of Chinese Paralympic Committee, said, "We can say proudly that the Guangzhou 2010 Asian Para Games were a complete success under the theme, "We Cheer, We Share, We Win". We are confident that the Asian Para Games flame with the value of humanitarianism will forever light the way of human progress and a better tomorrow." Dato' Zainal Abu Zarin described the games as "the best Games for [disabled] athletes ever staged in Asia so far". The ceremony was watched by a 60,000 capacity-stadium crowd. The games were officially closed by Abu Zarin.

Participating National Paralympic Committees
All 41 members of the newly emerged Asian Paralympic Committee participated in the 2010 Asian Para Games. Kuwaiti para athletes were not affected by the International Olympic Committee suspension and unlike their Asian Games counterpart, they participated in the Games under their own national flag.

Below is a list of all the participating NPCs; the number of competitors per delegation is indicated in brackets.

Sports

 Archery (9)
 Athletics (120)
 Badminton (13)
 Boccia (4)
 Bowling (10)
 Cycling (12)
 Football 5-a-side (1)
 Football 7-a-side (1)
 Goalball (2)
 Judo (12)
 Powerlifting (20)
 Rowing (4)
 Shooting (12)
 Swimming (81)
 Table tennis (20)
 Volleyball (2)
 Wheelchair basketball (2)
 Wheelchair fencing (12)
 Wheelchair tennis (4)

Medal table
Medals of the first-ever Asian Para Games were won by 31 of all the 41 countries and regions. Twenty athletes from 6 delegations had broken 17 world records a total of 21 times and 74 athletes from 13 delegations had broken 82 Asian records 98 times.

A total of 2,512 athletes from 41 Asian National Paralympic Committees participated in the Games, competing in 19 sports. In the Games, 17 world and 82 Asian records were broken.

A total of 1,020 medals (341 gold, 338 silver and 341 bronze medal) were awarded. Two bronze medals were awarded per event in wheelchair fencing (except women's team épée) and judo (except women's 48-, 57-, 63- and 70-kg categories). In athletics only three athletes participated in some events, thus bronzes were not awarded in four women's events (shot put – F35/36, 400 m – T12, 200 m – T12 and 100 m – T12) and the men's discus throw – F51/52/53, long jump – F36, 1500 m – T11 and 1500 m – T37. A tie for second place in the men's high jump – F42 event meant that two silvers were awarded; in this event, all medals were won by Chinese athletes. In badminton, due to the participation of only three players in the women's singles BMSTL2 event, no bronze medal was awarded. Only two athletes participated in women's −82.50 kg event of powerlifting, so no bronze was awarded. In women's wheelchair basketball, only three teams participated and no bronze was awarded.  

Notes
 "T" plus a number signifies a track class and "F" plus a number signifies a field class. Classes 32–38 cover athletes with different levels of cerebral palsy – both for athletes who use a wheelchair (32–34) and those that are ambulant (35–38).
 Classes 11, 12 and 13 cover the different levels of visual impairment.
 Classes 40–46 cover athletes who are ambulant with different levels of amputations.
 This class covers badminton player who is ambulant but has moderate impairments of the legs.

See also
 2010 Asian Games

References

External links
 Official website 
 International Paralympic Committee

 
Asian Para Games
Asian Games
Para

Asian Para Games